Jan Wallisch (born 16 January 1948) is a Czech rower. He competed in the men's coxed eight event at the 1968 Summer Olympics.

References

External links
 

1948 births
Living people
Czech male rowers
Olympic rowers of Czechoslovakia
Rowers at the 1968 Summer Olympics
People from Třeboň
Sportspeople from the South Bohemian Region